The 2005 U.S. Women's Open was the 60th U.S. Women's Open, held June 23–26 at Cherry Hills Country Club in Cherry Hills Village, Colorado, a suburb south of Denver. The event was televised by ESPN and NBC Sports.

Birdie Kim holed out from a greenside bunker on the 72nd hole to win her only major (and only LPGA) title, two strokes ahead of runners-up Brittany Lang and Morgan Pressel, both teenage amateurs from the United States. In the final pairing as a 54-hole co-leader, Pressel needed to hole her chip shot to tie, but it went  past and she bogeyed. Lorena Ochoa made four birdies on the back nine and led with one hole remaining, but made a quadruple-bogey on the 72nd hole to finish four strokes behind.

Pressel, 17, held a share of the 54-hole lead, with Karen Stupples and amateur Michelle Wie, age 15; Kim was one stroke back in a three-way tie for fourth, with 18-year-old Paula Creamer and Young Jo.

This was the first U.S. Women's Open at Cherry Hills, which previously hosted three U.S. Opens (1938, 1960, 1978) and two PGA Championships (1941, 1985).

Course layout

Source:

Past champions in the field

Made the cut

Missed the cut

 63 players made the cut at 150 (+8) or better

Round summaries

First round
Thursday, June 23, 2005

Source:

Second round
Friday, June 24, 2005

Source:

Third round
Saturday, June 25, 2005

Source:

Final round
Sunday, June 26, 2005

Source:

Scorecard

Cumulative tournament scores, relative to par

Source:

References

External links
 
 Golf Observer final leaderboard
 U.S. Women's Open Golf Championship
 U.S. Women's Open – past champions – 2005

U.S. Women's Open
Golf in Colorado
Sports competitions in Colorado
U.S. Women's Open
U.S. Women's Open
U.S. Women's Open
U.S. Women's Open
Women's sports in Colorado